Rosà is a town of 14.328 inhabitants in the province of Vicenza, Veneto, Italy. The name comes from the Latin word "roxata", the ancient name of the biggest irrigation channel that passed in that area.
The municipality has got 4 hamlets (Travettore, Sant'Anna, San Pietro, Cusinati). Rosà is officially European Town of Sport 2011.

History 

In the hamlet of San Pietro some Roman ashes have been found so we can suppose that there was a Roman village in this area. During the Migration Period the region was invaded by Quadi, Marcomanni, Sarmatians, Alemanni, Visigoths, Svevi, Alani, Unni, Lombards, Franks and Hungarians. The town of Rosà was officially born in 1533 during the rule of the Republic of Venice. After the Napoleonic invasion the whole region was sold to Austria-Hungary (with the neighboring Lombardy to form the Kingdom of Lombardy–Venetia) within which remained until 1866 when with the Third Italian War of Independence it became part of Italy. Rosà was very close to the front during the First World War. After the Second World War Rosà became part of the Italian Republic.

Administrative subdivisions 
The municipal statute  of Rosà, recognizes Sant'Anna, Travettore, Cusinati and San Pietro as frazioni. Such as Siena, Rosà is further historically divided into quartieri.

Frazioni 
 Travettore
 Sant'Anna
 Cusinati
 San Pietro

Quartieri 

Rosà is actually divided into 11 quartieri, with a president and social colors.
Every year these quartieri challenge in 2 tournament of amateur football and the Palio delle Rose.
These are the quartieri:
 Borgo Tocchi
 Ca' Dolfin
 Ca' Minotto
 Carpellina
 Cremona
 Lunardon
 Nuovo
 Oratorio
 Sant'Antonio
 Seminarietto
 Tigli-Matteotti

Government

Transport

Road 
Rosà is crossed by:
 SS 47 Valsugana which joins Padua to Trento 
 SR 245 Castellana which joins Rosà to Mestre
 SP 58 which joins Rosàto Nove

Railways 
Rosà has got a railway station on the Padua - Bassano line.

Urban mobility

Bus 
The municipality is located on the bus line Bassano del Grappa - Padova and on the Bassano del Grappa - Rossano Veneto line.

Bicycle path 
The city center is joined with the frazioni and the neighbouring municipalities of Bassano del Grappa, Rossano Veneto and Cartigliano by 21 km of bicycle path.

Airport 
The nearest international airports are Venice Marco Polo Airport and Treviso Airport.

International relations 

Rosà is twinned with:
 Schallstadt,  Germany, since 1991
 La Crau,  France, since 2006

See also 

 Parco rurale sovracomunale Civiltà delle Rogge

References 

(Google Maps)

Cities and towns in Veneto